Theydon may refer to 3 places in Essex:

 Theydon Bois
 Theydon Bois tube station
 Theydon Garnon
 Theydon Mount